Streptomyces virens is a bacterium species from the genus of Streptomyces. Streptomyces virens produces virenomycin.

See also 
 List of Streptomyces species

References

Further reading

External links
Type strain of Streptomyces virens at BacDive -  the Bacterial Diversity Metadatabase

virens
Bacteria described in 1986